The Lamkopf (also Lammkopf) is a mountain, in the Hochkönig massif within the Berchtesgaden Alps. It lies in the Zell am See in the Austrian state of Salzburg.

The peak can be climbed from the north the crossing between the Hochkönig and the Hochseiler or Übergossene Alm (climbing grade easy).

The first summit cross was erected in 1960, but destroyed by lightning in 2011. In 2013 a new summit cross was erected.

Literature 
 .
 Albert Precht: Alpenvereinsführer Hochkönig. 1st edition, Bergverlag Rother, Munich, 1989, .

References 

Two-thousanders of Austria
Mountains of the Alps
Mountains of Salzburg (state)
Berchtesgaden Alps